The Hadera Market bombing was a suicide bombing which occurred on October 26, 2005 at the entrance to the main fruit and vegetable open-air market in Hadera. Seven people were killed in the attack, and 55 were injured, of them five in severe condition.

The Islamic Jihad claimed responsibility for the attack.

The attack
On Wednesday, October 26, 2005, during the afternoon hours, a Palestinian suicide bomber who wore an explosive belt hidden underneath his clothes approached the open market place in the small Israeli coastal town of Hadera. The market place was busy with shoppers in advance of a Jewish Holiday, with many stocking up for the weekend. The suicide bomber detonated the explosive device at the market. The blast killed seven civilians and injured 55 people, of them five in severe condition.

Two Palestinian Islamist militant group Islamic Jihad claimed responsibility for the attack and stated that the attack was carried out by a 20-year-old Palestinian named Hassan Abu Zeid who originated from the Palestinian town Qabatiya in the West Bank.

The perpetrators and Israeli response 
The Islamist militant organization Palestinian Islamic Jihad claimed responsibility, and stated that the attack was carried out in revenge for the Israeli targeted killing of the Islamic Jihad commander Luay Saadi. Abu al-Muaman, one of the organization's leaders, stated in the press that "This attack is merely a preliminary response by the Palestinian rebellious groups, and harder retaliation is on its way." Israel retaliated by killing an Islamic Jihad's top commander in northern Gaza and another militant in an airstrike.

Official reactions
Involved parties
:
 An Israeli government spokesman called on the Palestinian Authority to increase its efforts to "disarm and dismantle the terror organization."
 Mark Regev, a spokesperson for the Israeli foreign ministry responded that "Abbas says the right thing... But if we have a criticism it's that he talks the right talk, we're waiting for him to follow through on these commitments. Now there have been some steps taken but we really need to see a serious disarming of these extremist groups."

:
 Palestinian National Authority - Palestinian Authority Chairman Mahmoud Abbas condemned the attack, saying: "It harms Palestinian interests and could widen the cycle of violence, chaos, extremism and bloodshed.".
 Palestinian negotiator Saeb Erekat denounced the attack and stated that he hoped the peace between the two sides would not be damaged.
 Khader Habib, a spokesperson for the Islamic Jihad stated that "The Islamic Jihad movement was committed to the truce, and is still committed to the truce, but this truce should be mutual. We cannot tolerate a one-sided truce."

 International
: White House spokesman Scott McClellan condemned the attack and called on the Palestinian leadership to crack down on the Palestinian militants.

References

External links

 At Least Five Killed in Bombing at Israeli Marketplace - published on the Washington Post on October 27, 2005
 Suicide Bombing Kills at Least 5, Israeli Police Say - published on the New York Times on October 26, 2005
 Five die in Israel market bombing - published on BBC News on October 27, 2005
 Woman injured in Hadera terror attack dies 4 years later - published on Ynet on September 17, 2009

Mass murder in 2005
Suicide bombing in the Israeli–Palestinian conflict
Terrorist attacks attributed to Palestinian militant groups
Terrorist incidents in Israel in 2005
Marketplace attacks in Asia
Islamic terrorism in Israel